Reignier-Esery (before 2008: Reignier) is a commune in the Haute-Savoie department in the Auvergne-Rhône-Alpes region in south-eastern France. It belongs to the cross-border agglomeration of the "Grand Genève".

Population

Transport 
The commune has a railway station, on the Aix-les-Bains–Annemasse line.

See also
Communes of the Haute-Savoie department

References

Communes of Haute-Savoie